Jan Laeremans (born 23 May 1962) is a Belgian-Flemish politician for Vlaams Belang and a member of the Flemish parliament.

Laeremans is the grandson of People's Union Senator Leo Wouters. He studied Germanic philology at the Catholic University of Leuven where he became a member of Vlaams Blok and then worked as a high school languages teacher. Laeremans became a provincial councilor Flemish Brabant in 1991 for Vlaams Blok and later Vlaams Belang. He held this role until 2019 when he was elected to the Flemish parliament.

References 

Living people
Members of the Flemish Parliament
1962 births
Vlaams Belang politicians
21st-century Belgian politicians